Thethaitangar is a village in the Thethaitangar CD block in the Simdega subdivision of the Simdega district in the Indian state of Jharkhand.

Geography

Location                        
Thethaitangar is located at

Area overview 
In the area presented in the map alongside, “the landscape is formed of hills and undulating plateau” in the south-western part of the Chota Nagpur Plateau. About 32% of the district is covered with forests (mark the shaded portions in the map.) It is an overwhelmingly rural area with 92.83% of the population living in the rural areas.  A major portion of the rural population depends on rain-fed agriculture (average annual rainfall: 1,100-1,200 mm) for a living.

Note: The map alongside presents some of the notable locations in the district. All places marked in the map are linked in the larger full screen map.

Civic administration  
There is a police station at Thethaitangar. 
 
The headquarters of Thethaitangar CD block are located at Thethaitangar village.

Demographics 
According to the 2011 Census of India, Thethaitangar had a total population of 4,423, of which 2,163 (49%) were males and 2,260 (51%) were females. Population in the age range 0–6 years was 736. The total number of literate persons in Thethaitangar was 2,630 (71.33% of the population over 6 years.

(*For language details see Thethaitangar block#Language and religion)

Education 
Government Middle School Thethaitangar is a Hindi-medium coeducational institution established in 1903. It has facilities for teaching in class I to class VIII.

St Anne High School is a Hindi-medium coeducational institution established at Taraboga in 1985. It has facilities for teaching in class VI to class X. The school has a playground and a library with 5,000 books and has 6 computers for teaching and learning purposes.

Healthcare   
There is a Referral Hospital at Thethaitangar.

References 

Villages in Simdega district